Defending champion Björn Borg successfully defended his title, defeating Jimmy Connors in the final, 3–6, 6–2, 6–1, 5–7, 6–4 to win the gentlemen's singles tennis title at the 1977 Wimbledon Championships.

It was the first Wimbledon appearance for future three-time champion John McEnroe, who entered as a qualifier and reached the semifinals before losing to Connors. It was also the final major appearance for four-time Wimbledon champion Rod Laver.

Seeds

  Jimmy Connors (final)
  Björn Borg (champion)
  Guillermo Vilas (third round)
  Roscoe Tanner (first round)
  Brian Gottfried (second round)
  Ilie Năstase (quarterfinals)
  Raúl Ramírez (second round)
  Vitas Gerulaitis (semifinals)
  Dick Stockton (fourth round)
  Adriano Panatta (second round)
  Stan Smith (fourth round)
  Wojciech Fibak (fourth round)
  Phil Dent (quarterfinals)
  Mark Cox (fourth round)
  Bob Lutz (third round)
  Harold Solomon (first round)

Qualifying

Draw

Finals

Top half

Section 1

Section 2

Section 3

Section 4

Bottom half

Section 5

Section 6

Section 7

Section 8

References

External links

 1977 Wimbledon Championships – Men's draws and results at the International Tennis Federation

Men's Singles
Wimbledon Championship by year – Men's singles